Zhelanov is a surname. Notable people with the surname include:

Mikhail Zhelanov (born 1964), Russian footballer and manager
Sergey Zhelanov (born 1957), Soviet athlete

Russian-language surnames